Jack and Jill is a traditional English nursery rhyme. 

Jack and Jill may also refer to:

Arts and entertainment

Film and television
 Jack and Jill (1917 film), an American Western silent film
 Jack and Jill: A Postscript, a 1970 Australian film
 Jack and Jill (1998 film), a Canadian anti-romantic comedy film
 Jack and Jill (2011 film), an American comedy film
 Jack N' Jill, 2022 Indian science-fiction film by Santhosh Sivan
 Jack & Jill (TV series), a 1999–2001 American comedy-drama series

Literature
 Jack & Jill (comics), a 1954–1985 British children's comics magazine
 Jack and Jill (magazine), an American bimonthly magazine for children
 Jack & Jill (novel), a 1996 Alex Cross novel by James Patterson
 Jack and Jill: A Village Story, an 1880 children's book by Louisa May Alcott

Music
 "Jack and Jill" (Raydio song), 1978
 "Jack and Jill", a 1969 song by Tommy Roe

Companies and organizations
 Jack and Jill of America, an African American leadership group
 Jack and Jill Foundation, a British support group, founded by Jonathan Irwin, for families of children with disabilities
 Jack and Jill Ice Cream, an American ice cream truck company
 Jack and Jill School, an elementary school in Bacolod, Negros Occidental, Philippines

Other uses
 Jack and Jill (dance), a format of competition in partner dancing
 Jack and Jill (party), a Canadian fundraiser for an engaged couple
 Jack and Jill bathroom, a bathroom between two bedrooms
 Clayton Windmills, nicknamed Jack and Jill, near Clayton, West Sussex, England